The following is a list of Auburn Tigers men's basketball head coaches. The Tigers have had 20 coaches in their 113-season history.

References

Auburn

Auburn Tigers basketball coaches